The O. Henry Playhouse was an early American anthology television series which featured television adaptations of short stories written by 19th-century author O. Henry and primarily set in New York City. The series was both hosted and narrated by Thomas Mitchell, who portrayed the title character, and featured several television and film stars during its run such as Maureen Stapleton, Charles Bronson, DeForest Kelley, Lisa Montell, Otto Kruger, Max Showalter and Ernest Borgnine.

The series was syndicated and began running on a handful of stations late in 1956. With the sale to General Cigar Company of Baltimore in May 1957, the series was contracted to 188 markets. According to Billboard's "Pulse Film Ratings" The O. Henry Playhouse generally received television ratings around 10.0 for its only season and ranked in the middle of the "Syndicated Film Drama Shows" category.

DVD release
Unseen for decades and largely forgotten, The O. Henry Playhouse has recently received a DVD release. Classic Flix, a rental and retail site with a home video label, has restored thirty-nine episodes of the series and is releasing them in three installments during 2021-22.

The web site for the DVD release features plot summaries of each episode, along with links to online texts of the original stories so viewers can compare O. Henry's writings and the television adaptations. The site also includes cast and crew information for each episode and a video sample from the episode. The overall description of the series recounts its unusual story telling method:

Veteran character actor Thomas Mitchell stars in each episode as writer O. Henry himself as he relates his stories to his publisher, his barber, a bartender, or the cop on the beat. In some episodes, O. Henry meets his characters as he discovers firsthand the story he will later write. This rather unique story telling method is made possible by the fame of the author himself and the O Henry audience's desire to learn where each story came from.

Several years before the DVD release Ron Hall, an entrepreneur specializing in public domain video material, related how he received a large collection of original 16mm prints of the series. He posted a video sample of the "Two Renegades" episode, along with general discussion of the series' history, copyright status, number of episodes, and sometimes unexpected casting.

Episodes

Series 1

References

Further reading
Castleman, Harry and Walter J. Podrazik. Harry and Wally's Favorite TV Shows. New York: Prentice Hall Press, 1989. 
Borgnine, Ernest. Ernie: The Autobiography. New York: Citadel Press, 2008.

External links

The O. Henry Playhouse at https://www.ohenryplayhouse.com/
The O. Henry Playhouse at CVTA with episode list

First-run syndicated television programs in the United States
Period television series
1950s American anthology television series
1957 American television series debuts
1957 American television series endings
New York City in fiction
O. Henry